Systemic vasculitides are a group of heterogeneous diseases that share the etiology in terms of inflammation of the blood vessels (vasculitis) – more specifically the arterioles – with systemic envolvement. Some examples of this group include granulomatosis with polyangiitis, polyarteritis nodosa, Behçet's disease, and HSP.

References

Autoimmune diseases
Systemic connective tissue disorders